George Isaac is the name of:

George Isaac (politician) (born 1938), Egyptian politician
George Isaac (producer), producer

See also

George Isaacs (1883–1979), British politician and trades unionist